Bikal is a village in Baranya county, Hungary.

Other Meanings 

BiKal is also the name of a developer of Network IP CCTV systems based in the UK. The name is derived from ancient Hindu culture as well as a combination of the creators name.

External links 
 Street map 
 BiKal IP CCTV

Populated places in Baranya County